Armando Barrientos (24 March 1906 – 2 October 1998) is a Cuban fencer. He competed in the individual foil and team épée events at the 1948 Summer Olympics.

References

External links
 

1906 births
1998 deaths
Cuban male fencers
Sportspeople from Havana
Olympic fencers of Cuba
Fencers at the 1948 Summer Olympics
Pan American Games medalists in fencing
Pan American Games bronze medalists for Cuba
Fencers at the 1951 Pan American Games
Medalists at the 1951 Pan American Games
20th-century Cuban people